In data mining and statistics, hierarchical clustering (also called hierarchical cluster analysis or HCA) is a method of cluster analysis that seeks to build a hierarchy of clusters. Strategies for hierarchical clustering generally fall into two categories:
 Agglomerative: This is a "bottom-up" approach: Each observation starts in its own cluster, and pairs of clusters are merged as one moves up the hierarchy.
 Divisive: This is a "top-down" approach: All observations start in one cluster, and splits are performed recursively as one moves down the hierarchy.

In general, the merges and splits are determined in a greedy manner. The results of hierarchical clustering are usually presented in a dendrogram.

However, for some special cases, optimal efficient agglomerative methods (of complexity ) are known: SLINK for single-linkage and CLINK for complete-linkage clustering. In many cases, the memory overheads of this approach are too large to make it practically usable.

Except for the special case of single-linkage, none of the algorithms (except exhaustive search in ) can be guaranteed to find the optimum solution.

Hierarchical clustering has the distinct advantage that any valid measure of distance can be used. In fact, the observations themselves are not required: all that is used is a matrix of distances.

Cluster Linkage 
In order to decide which clusters should be combined (for agglomerative), or where a cluster should be split (for divisive), a measure of dissimilarity between sets of observations is required. In most methods of hierarchical clustering, this is achieved by use of an appropriate distance d, such as the Euclidean distance, between single observations of the data set, and a linkage criterion, which specifies the dissimilarity of sets as a function of the pairwise distances of observations in the sets. The choice of metric as well as linkage can have a major impact on the result of the clustering, where the lower level metric determines which objects are most similar, whereas the linkage criterion influences the shape of the clusters. For example, complete-linkage tends to produce more spherical clusters than single-linkage.

The linkage criterion determines the distance between sets of observations as a function of the pairwise distances between observations.

Some commonly used linkage criteria between two sets of observations A and B and a distance d are:

Some of these can only be recomputed recursively (WPGMA, WPGMC), for many a recursive computation with Lance-Williams-equations is more efficient, while for other (Mini-Max, Hausdorff, Medoid) the distances have to be computed with the slower full formula. Other linkage criteria include:

 The probability that candidate clusters spawn from the same distribution function (V-linkage).
 The product of in-degree and out-degree on a k-nearest-neighbour graph (graph degree linkage).
 The increment of some cluster descriptor (i.e., a quantity defined for measuring the quality of a cluster) after merging two clusters.

Agglomerative clustering example 

For example, suppose this data is to be clustered, and the Euclidean distance is the distance metric.

The hierarchical clustering dendrogram would be:

Cutting the tree at a given height will give a partitioning clustering at a selected precision. In this example, cutting after the second row (from the top) of the dendrogram will yield clusters {a} {b c} {d e} {f}. Cutting after the third row will yield clusters {a} {b c} {d e f}, which is a coarser clustering, with a smaller number but larger clusters.

This method builds the hierarchy from the individual elements by progressively merging clusters. In our example, we have six elements {a} {b} {c} {d} {e} and {f}. The first step is to determine which elements to merge in a cluster. Usually, we want to take the two closest elements, according to the chosen distance.

Optionally, one can also construct a distance matrix at this stage, where the number in the i-th row j-th column is the distance between the i-th and j-th elements. Then, as clustering progresses, rows and columns are merged as the clusters are merged and the distances updated. This is a common way to implement this type of clustering, and has the benefit of caching distances between clusters. A simple agglomerative clustering algorithm is described in the single-linkage clustering page; it can easily be adapted to different types of linkage (see below).

Suppose we have merged the two closest elements b and c, we now have the following clusters {a}, {b, c}, {d}, {e} and {f}, and want to merge them further. To do that, we need to take the distance between {a} and {b c}, and therefore define the distance between two clusters.
 The maximum distance between elements of each cluster (also called complete-linkage clustering):

 The minimum distance between elements of each cluster (also called single-linkage clustering):

 The mean distance between elements of each cluster (also called average linkage clustering, used e.g. in UPGMA):

 The sum of all intra-cluster variance.
 The increase in variance for the cluster being merged (Ward's method)
 The probability that candidate clusters spawn from the same distribution function (V-linkage).

In case of tied minimum distances, a pair is randomly chosen, thus being able to generate several structurally different dendrograms. Alternatively, all tied pairs may be joined at the same time, generating a unique dendrogram.

One can always decide to stop clustering when there is a sufficiently small number of clusters (number criterion). Some linkages may also guarantee that agglomeration occurs at a greater distance between clusters than the previous agglomeration, and then one can stop clustering when the clusters are too far apart to be merged (distance criterion). However, this is not the case of, e.g., the centroid linkage where the so-called reversals (inversions, departures from ultrametricity) may occur.

Divisive clustering 

The basic principle of divisive clustering was published as the DIANA (DIvisive ANAlysis Clustering) algorithm. Initially, all data is in the same cluster, and the largest cluster is split until every object is separate.
Because there exist  ways of splitting each cluster, heuristics are needed. DIANA chooses the object with the maximum average dissimilarity and then moves all objects to this cluster that are more similar to the new cluster than to the remainder.

Software

Open source implementations 

 ALGLIB implements several hierarchical clustering algorithms (single-link, complete-link, Ward) in C++ and C# with O(n²) memory and O(n³) run time.
 ELKI includes multiple hierarchical clustering algorithms, various linkage strategies and also includes the efficient SLINK, CLINK and Anderberg algorithms, flexible cluster extraction from dendrograms and various other cluster analysis algorithms.
 Julia has an implementation inside the Clustering.jl package.
 Octave, the GNU analog to MATLAB implements hierarchical clustering in function "linkage".
 Orange, a data mining software suite, includes hierarchical clustering with interactive dendrogram visualisation.
 R has built-in functions and packages that provide functions for hierarchical clustering.
 SciPy implements hierarchical clustering in Python, including the efficient SLINK algorithm.
 scikit-learn also implements hierarchical clustering in Python.
 Weka includes hierarchical cluster analysis.

Commercial implementations 
 MATLAB includes hierarchical cluster analysis.
 SAS includes hierarchical cluster analysis in PROC CLUSTER.
 Mathematica includes a Hierarchical Clustering Package.
 NCSS includes hierarchical cluster analysis.
 SPSS includes hierarchical cluster analysis.
 Qlucore Omics Explorer includes hierarchical cluster analysis.
 Stata includes hierarchical cluster analysis.
 CrimeStat includes a nearest neighbor hierarchical cluster algorithm with a graphical output for a Geographic Information System.

See also 

 Binary space partitioning
 Bounding volume hierarchy
 Brown clustering
 Cladistics
 Cluster analysis
 Computational phylogenetics
 CURE data clustering algorithm
 Dasgupta's objective
 Dendrogram
 Determining the number of clusters in a data set
 Hierarchical clustering of networks
 Locality-sensitive hashing
 Nearest neighbor search
 Nearest-neighbor chain algorithm
 Numerical taxonomy
 OPTICS algorithm
 Statistical distance
 Persistent homology

References

Further reading 
 
 

Network analysis
Cluster analysis algorithms